William Sydney Gordon Grevett (25 October 1892 – 26 July 1967) was an English cricketer and footballer. His batting and bowling styles are unknown. He was born at Eastbourne, Sussex.

Cricket career
Grevett made a single first-class appearance for Sussex against Glamorgan at the County Cricket Ground, Hove, in 1922. Sussex won the toss and elected to bat, scoring 261 in their first-innings with Grevett, who batted at number five, scoring four runs. In response, Glamorgan made 173 in their first-innings. Sussex made 255 in their second-innings, with Grevett contributing with nine runs. In both innings he was dismissed by Johnnie Clay. Glamorgan was left with a target of 344 to win. However, they could only make 142 in their second-innings chase, giving victory to Sussex by 201 runs. This was his only major appearance for Sussex.

Grevett played club cricket for Eastbourne from 1931 to 1938.

Football career
Grevett also played Amateur Football for Eastbourne F.C. between 1908 and 1925. Playing in the Southern Amateur League and made 194 appearances. In 1931 he became manager for Eastbourne FC for 8 years, making another league appearance in 1935.

Personal Life
William was enlisted into the Royal Air Force in 1915   

He died at Eastbourne, Sussex, on 26 July 1967 aged 74. His nephew, Robert Grevett, also played a single first-class match for Sussex.

Honours

Player
AFA Senior Cup: 1921–22. 1924–25
Challenge International du Nord: 1909
Eastbourne Charity Cup: 1909–10
Southern Amateur League Division 1: 1922–23 
Sussex Senior Cup: 1921–22

Manager
Sussex RUR Cup: 1932–33
Sussex Senior Cup: 1931–32, 1932–33

References

External links
Wililam Grevett at ESPNcricinfo
Wililam Grevett at CricketArchive
William Grevett at Eastbourne Town

1892 births
1967 deaths
Sportspeople from Eastbourne
Eastbourne Town F.C. players
Eastbourne Town F.C. managers
English cricketers
Sussex cricketers